Walther Heinrich Alfred Hermann von Brauchitsch (4 October 1881 – 18 October 1948) was a German field marshal and the Commander-in-Chief (Oberbefehlshaber) of the German Army during World War II. Born into an aristocratic military family, he entered army service in 1901. During World War I, he served with distinction on the corps-level and division-level staff on the Western Front.

After the 1933 Nazi seizure of power, Brauchitsch was put in charge of Wehrkreis I, the East Prussian military district. He borrowed immense sums of money from Adolf Hitler and became dependent on his financial help. Brauchitsch served as Commander-in-Chief of the German Army from February 1938 to December 1941. He played a key role in the Battle of France and oversaw the German invasions of Yugoslavia and Greece. For his part in the Battle of France, he became one of twelve generals promoted to field marshal.

After suffering a heart attack in November 1941 and being blamed by Hitler for the failure of Operation Typhoon, the Wehrmacht's attack on Moscow, Brauchitsch was dismissed as Commander-in-Chief. He spent the rest of the war in enforced retirement.

After the war, Brauchitsch was arrested on charges of war crimes, but he died of pneumonia in 1948 before he could be prosecuted.

Early life
Brauchitsch was born in Berlin on 4 October 1881 as the sixth child of Bernhard Eduard von Brauchitsch, a cavalry general, and his wife, Charlotte Bertha von Gordon. The Brauchitsch family had a long tradition of military service, and like his forefathers, Brauchitsch was raised in the tradition of the Prussian officer corps. His family moved in the leading social circles of Berlin's high society, and his family name and father's military rank put him on equal footing with any officer or official. In his teens, Brauchitsch was interested in politics, and was fascinated by art. To help him pursue these interests, his father enrolled him at Französisches Gymnasium Berlin rather than a military academy.

In 1895 Brauchitsch joined the military academy in Potsdam. He later transferred to the Hauptkadettenanstalt Groß Lichterfelde, where in his final year he belonged to the top class for gifted students and was chosen, like his brother Adolf five years before, as a page by Empress Augusta Victoria. During his time serving the empress at court, he learned manners and bearing that were noted for the rest of his life.

Upon graduation in 1900 he received his commission as a lieutenant in an infantry regiment. A medical condition made him unfit for service in the infantry, so he was transferred to an artillery regiment. He was put in charge of training recruits in riding and driving. He then joined the General Staff office in Berlin, where he was promoted to first lieutenant in 1909.

World War I
At the outbreak of World War I in August 1914, Brauchitsch had reached the rank of captain. He was appointed staff officer to the XVI Army Corps, stationed near Metz. During World War I, he served with the  34th Infantry Division and Guards Reserve Corps. Between 1914 and 1916, he took part in the Battle of Verdun and Battle of the Argonne Forest. In the remaining two years of the conflict, Brauchitsch took part in the Third Battle of the Aisne, the Aisne-Marne offensive, the Second Battle of the Aisne, the Battle of Armentières, and the Battle of Flanders. Brauchitsch was awarded the Iron Cross 1st Class and the House Order of Hohenzollern, and ended the war with the rank of major.

Weimar Republic
The German military underwent a forced reduction in 1919 to comply with the Treaty of Versailles, but Brauchitsch managed to remain in service. He remained with the General Staff, where he had no opportunity to use his knowledge of artillery. Eventually, in 1920, he was permitted to transfer to the staff of the 2nd Artillery Regiment. The following year, he worked in the Ministry of the Reichswehr, in the Artillery Department.

Brauchitsch's assignment in the Artillery Department was to reorganize artillery formations and implement lessons learned in the closing months of the war. He added ideas of his own, including modifying the classification system for light, medium, and heavy artillery. Heavy artillery, formerly known as "corps artillery", now became "reinforcement artillery". He also added emphasis on the combination and co-operation between artillery and infantry.

After three years in the Artillery Department, he was promoted to lieutenant colonel in 1925. As of 1 November 1927, Brauchitsch was appointed Chief of Staff of the 6th Infantry Division in Münster, Westphalia, one of the strongest garrisons in the west of Germany. In the last years of the Weimar Republic, he took over the Army Training Department and became a colonel (promoted in 1928). In October 1931, Brauchitsch received his major general promotion.

Nazi Germany
In 1933, Adolf Hitler and the Nazi Party came to power and began to expand the military, in order to realize Hitler's military ambitions. On 1 February 1933, Brauchitsch was named commander of the East Prussian military district (Wehrkreis I) and chief of the 1st Division in Königsberg. As a consequence of the German re-armament the command position Befehlshaber im Wehrkreis I (Commander of the 1st military district) was expanded. Brauchitsch was promoted to lieutenant general in October 1933. The staff of the 1st Division formed the staff of the 1st Army Corps and Brauchitsch was appointed its first commanding general on 21 June 1935.

Although Brauchitsch felt at home in Prussia, he had a clash with Erich Koch, the local Gauleiter (party head and de facto head of civil administration of the province). Koch was known as something of a crook who greatly enjoyed the power he possessed, and who would bring violence to his enemies. As neither Koch nor Brauchitsch wanted to lose their jobs in the region, the two attempted to keep their feud unofficial. As a result, Berlin hardly learned of their dispute.

A dispute emerged a few years later, when Brauchitsch learned that Reichsführer-SS Heinrich Himmler planned to replace the army guards in East Prussia with SS men, with the purpose of persecuting Jews, Protestant and Catholic churches in the district. Even though Brauchitsch managed to prevent the SS replacement of the army troops in the region, Himmler categorized him as "a junker", and informed Hitler of the disagreement. Brauchitsch claimed he had done his duty, saying laconically, "Civilians are not allowed to enter that area."

Brauchitsch obtained the rank of general of artillery in 1936. When the Commander-in-Chief of the Army, Werner von Fritsch, was accused of homosexuality, Hitler promoted Brauchitsch to  colonel general and appointed him the new army chief on the recommendation of the Army High Command on 4 February 1938. At the time of this promotion Brauchitsch was also granted cabinet-level rank and authority, though not the formal title of Reichsminister. The homosexual allegations were in reality a trap set by Hitler as an excuse to dismiss one of the aristocratic senior officers within the Army High Command. Fritsch's removal was a severe test of the stability of the German internal administration of that time.

Brauchitsch welcomed the Nazi policy of rearmament. The relationship between Hitler and Brauchitsch improved during Brauchitsch's confusion about whether to leave his wife for his mistress, in the middle of the Munich Crisis; Hitler set aside his usual anti-divorce sentiments and encouraged Brauchitsch to divorce and remarry. Hitler even lent him 80,000 Reichsmarks so he could afford the divorce. Over time, Brauchitsch became largely reliant on Hitler for financial help.

Like Colonel General Ludwig Beck, Brauchitsch opposed Hitler's annexation of Austria and intervention in Czechoslovakia, although he did not resist Hitler's plans for war, again preferring to refrain from politics. Yet in April 1939 Brauchitsch, together with Colonel General Wilhelm Keitel, was awarded the Golden Party Badge by Hitler in commemoration of the occupation of Czechoslovakia.

In the final months before World War II, Brauchitsch focused on Italy's potential to aid the Nazi military cause. In May 1939 he inspected the Italian military installations in Libya, and La Spezia, to affirm Italo-German alliance. However, this turned out not to be an easy task, as the Italian leader Benito Mussolini expected economic support from the Reich in return for his military collaboration. Fritsch had already told Brauchitsch that the Italian military was in "extremely poor fighting shape". Joachim von Ribbentrop, Germany's Foreign Minister and the main architect of the Axis alliance, constantly interfered with Brauchitsch's efforts, as he wanted to see his work consolidated at all costs.

World War II
During the invasion of Poland, Brauchitsch oversaw most plans. The Polish campaign was often cited as the first example of "blitzkrieg", but blitzkrieg was not a theory or an official doctrine. The campaign did not resemble the popular perception of what became known as blitzkrieg. The Panzer divisions were spread thinly among the infantry and were not granted operational independence or grouped en masse, as they would be in the 1940 invasion of Western Europe. The operative method of the Wehrmacht in Poland followed the more traditional Vernichtungsgedanke. What is commonly referred to as blitzkrieg did not develop until after the campaign in the west in June 1940. It was not the cause but rather the consequence of victory. Brauchitsch himself had to be convinced that armour could act independently at the operational level, before the campaign.

Brauchitsch supported harsh measures against the Polish population, which he claimed were needed for securing German Lebensraum ("living space"). He had a central role in the death sentences for Polish prisoners taken in the defense of the Polish Post Office in Danzig, rejecting the clemency appeal.

Invasion of Western Europe and the Balkans

By early November 1939, Brauchitsch and Chief of the General Staff Franz Halder started to consider overthrowing Hitler, who had fixed "X-day", the invasion of France, as 12 November 1939. Both officers believed that the invasion was doomed to fail. On 5 November 1939, the Army General Staff prepared a special memorandum purporting to recommend against launching an attack on the Western powers that year. Brauchitsch reluctantly agreed to read the document to Hitler and did so in a meeting on 5 November. Brauchitsch attempted to talk Hitler into putting off X-day by saying that morale in the German Army was worse than in 1918. Brauchitsch went on to complain: "The aggressive spirit of the German infantry is sadly below the standard of the First World War ... [there have been] certain symptoms of insubordination similar to those of 1917–18."

Hitler flew into a rage, accusing the General Staff and Brauchitsch personally of disloyalty, cowardice, sabotage, and defeatism. He returned to the army headquarters at Zossen, where he "arrived in such poor shape that at first he could only give a somewhat incoherent account of the proceedings." After that meeting, both Brauchitsch and Halder told Carl Friedrich Goerdeler, a key leader of the anti-Nazi movement, that overthrowing Hitler was simply something that they could not do and that he should find other officers to take part in the plot. Hitler called a meeting of the General Staff, where he declared that he would smash the West within a year. He also vowed to "destroy the spirit of Zossen", a threat that panicked Halder to such an extent that he forced the conspirators to abort their second planned coup attempt. On 7 November, following heavy snowstorms, Hitler put off X-Day until further notice, which removed Brauchitsch and Halder's primary motivation for the plot.

While preparations were underway for the Battle of France, General Erich von Manstein, then serving as chief of staff of Army Group A, produced his famous Sichelschnitt ("sickle cut") plan. Brauchitsch and Halder did not approve of Sichelschnitt. When Manstein demanded that Sichelschnitt be presented to OKH, Halder suggested transferring Manstein somewhere to the east, excluding him from the planning process. Brauchitsch agreed and transferred him to Silesia. However, Hitler invited a group of officers to lunch, and Manstein was among them. He managed to present his plan directly to Hitler. The following day, Hitler ordered Brauchitsch to accept Manstein's plan, which the Führer presented as his own. Despite his original scepticism, Brauchitsch eventually saw the plan's potential and felt that the army had a real chance of success in France.

After the surprisingly swift fall of France, Brauchitsch was promoted to field marshal in July 1940, during the 1940 Field Marshal Ceremony. After France had been occupied and divided, he and the rest of the high command were looking forward to a similarly easy and swift campaign against Great Britain, now seriously weakened by the French campaign. He was confident that Britain would be easily defeated: "We consider the victory already won. England remains secure, but only so long as we choose." Had Operation Sealion, the plan for the invasion of Britain, succeeded, Hitler intended to place Brauchitsch in charge of the new conquest. As the Luftwaffe could not gain the requisite air superiority, the Battle of Britain was lost and so the plan was shelved and eventually cancelled.

In the swift invasion and occupation of Yugoslavia and Greece in early April 1941, the Germans committed some 337,000 men, 2,000 mortars, 1,500 artillery pieces, 1,100 anti-tank guns, 875 tanks and 740 other armoured fighting vehicles, all of which were under the overall command of Brauchitsch. By the end of the month, all of Yugoslavia and Greece were in German hands.

Operation Barbarossa

Brauchitsch ordered his army and commanders to cease criticism of racist Nazi policies, as harsh measures were needed for the "forthcoming battle of destiny of the German people". When Germany turned East and invaded the Soviet Union in June 1941, he again played a key part, making modifications to the original plan. Like his friend and colleague, Wilhelm Keitel, Brauchitsch did not protest when Hitler gave the German army the same instructions as the SS on whom to kill in the occupied territory, but he later issued a series of decrees that ordered that Commissars were to be shot only if their anti-German sentiments were "especially recognizable".

As the Battle of Moscow got under way, his health was starting to fail. Even so, he continued his work, as he was determined to take Moscow before the start of winter. The army's failure to take Moscow earned Hitler's enmity, and things worsened for him, as he suffered a heart attack in November. He was also informed that he had a malignant cardiac disease, most likely incurable.

Dismissal 

In the aftermath of the failure at Moscow, Brauchitsch was dismissed as Commander-in-Chief of the German Army on 19 December and was transferred to the Führerreserve (officers reserve), where he remained without assignment until the end of the war; he never saw Hitler again. He spent the last three years of the war living in the Brdy mountains southwest of Prague. One of his few public comments after retirement was a statement condemning the 20 July plot against Hitler for which he denounced several former colleagues. Later, he excused himself to Halder, claiming he had been forced to do so to save a relative's life.

Nuremberg trials
In August 1945, Brauchitsch was arrested at his estate and imprisoned by the British at Camp 198 in South Wales. He was charged at the Subsequent Nuremberg trials with war crimes related to his command of Operation Barbarossa. However, he died, aged 67, on 18 October 1948 of bronchial pneumonia in a British-controlled military hospital in Hamburg before facing trial for conspiracy and crimes against humanity.

Personal life
The couple had a daughter and two sons, including Bernd von Brauchitsch, who later served in the Luftwaffe during World War II as Hermann Göring's adjutant. They were divorced in 1938 after 28 years of marriage, as Brauchitsch had developed another romantic interest.

In 1925, Brauchitsch met Charlotte Rueffer, the daughter of a Silesian judge. He wanted a divorce, but his wife refused. Rueffer later married a bank director named Schmidt, who drowned in his bath during a visit to Berlin. When Brauchitsch returned from East Prussia in 1937, the pair resumed their affair. They married immediately after Brauchitsch had divorced Karstedt.

Brauchitsch was the uncle of Manfred von Brauchitsch, a 1930s Mercedes-Benz "Silver Arrow" Grand Prix driver, and also Hans Bernd von Haeften and Werner von Haeften, who were members of the German resistance against Hitler.

Assessment

Historian Helmut Krausnick characterizes Brauchitsch as "an outstanding professional who lived up to the traditions of his profession, but especially lacked the strength of personality to deal with Hitler". Historian Ian Kershaw describes him less sympathetically as a "spineless individual, who was frightened by Hitler. He was no person to lead any type of front or revolt."

Awards
 Iron Cross (1914) 2nd Class (13 September 1914) & 1st Class (1 October 1915)
  Württemberg Friedrich Order with Swords (7 May 1915)
 Knight's Cross of the House Order of Hohenzollern with Swords (15 May 1917)
 Saxe-Meiningen Honour Cross for War Merit (2 January 1918)
 Service Award for 25 service years (17 April 1920)
 The Honour Cross of the World War 1914/1918 (18 December 1934)
 Wehrmacht Long Service Award 1st Class (2 October 1936)
  Order of Merit of the Kingdom of Hungary 1st Class (20 August 1938)
 Star of the German Red Cross Decoration (5 September 1938)
 Grand Cross of the Royal Italian Order of Saints Maurice and Lazarus (3 January 1939)
 Grand Cross of the Order of the White Rose of Finland (10 March 1939)
 Golden Party Badge (20 April 1939).
 Order of the Yugoslav Crown 1st Class (1 June 1939)
 Sudetenland Medal with Clasp (7 June 1939)
 Clasp to the Iron Cross (1939) 2nd Class (30 September 1939) & 1st Class (30 September 1939)
 Knights Cross of the Iron Cross (30 September 1939) as Colonel General and Commander-in-Chief of the Army
 Spanish Military Merit Cross 1st Class (1939)
 Grand Cross of the Royal Bulgarian Order of St Alexander with Swords (15 May 1941)
 Grand Cross of the Royal Hungarian Order of Merit with Swords (31 May 1941)
 Grand Cross of the Romanian Order of Michael the Brave (11 October 1941)
 Slovak War Victory Cross 1st Class (20 October 1941)
 Grand Cross of the Finnish Order of the Cross of Liberty (19 July 1942)
 Japanese Order of the Rising Sun 1st Class (26 September 1942)

Dates of rank
 Leutnant (Second Lieutenant) – 22 March 1900
 Oberleutnant (First Lieutenant) – 18 October 1909
 Hauptmann (Captain) – 18 December 1913
 Major (Major) – 15 July 1918
 Oberstleutnant (Lieutenant Colonel) – 1 June 1923
 Oberst (Colonel) – 1 April 1928
 Generalmajor (Major General) – 1 October 1931
 Generalleutnant (Lieutenant General) – 1 October 1933
  General der Artillerie (General of Artillery) –1 October 1935
Generaloberst (Colonel General) – 4 February 1938
 Generalfeldmarschall (Field Marshal) – 19 July 1940

See also
 Corruption within the Wehrmacht

References

Sources

 Printed
 
 
  	
 
 
 
 
 
 
 
 
 
 
 
 
 
 
 
 
 
Online

External links 

 

1881 births
1948 deaths
Military personnel from Berlin
German Army World War II field marshals
Silesian nobility
German Army personnel of World War I
People from the Province of Brandenburg
People indicted for war crimes
German people who died in prison custody
Prisoners who died in British military detention
Recipients of the Order of Michael the Brave, 1st class
Recipients of the Order of the Yugoslav Crown
Recipients of the Knight's Cross of the Iron Cross
Grand Crosses of the Order of Merit of the Republic of Hungary (military)
Grand Crosses of the Order of the Cross of Liberty
Grand Cordons of the Order of the Rising Sun
Französisches Gymnasium Berlin alumni
Prussian Army personnel
Recipients of the clasp to the Iron Cross, 1st class
Lieutenant generals of the Reichswehr
Deaths from pneumonia in Germany
Deaths from bronchopneumonia